The Church of Greece, part of the wider Greek Orthodox Church, is one of the autocephalous churches which make up the communion of Eastern Orthodox Christianity. Its canonical territory is confined to the borders of Greece prior to the Balkan Wars of 1912–1913 ("Old Greece"), with the rest of Greece (the "New Lands", Crete, and the Dodecanese) being subject to the jurisdiction of the Ecumenical Patriarchate of Constantinople. However, most of the dioceses of the Metropolises of the New Lands are de facto administered as part of the Church of Greece for practical reasons, under an agreement between the churches of Athens and Constantinople. The primate of the Church of Greece is the archbishop of Athens and All Greece.

Prevailing religion of Greece

Adherence to the Eastern Orthodox Church was established as a definitive hallmark of Greek ethnic identity in the first modern Greek constitution, the "Epidaurus Law" of 1822, during the Greek War of Independence.  The preamble of all subsequent Greek constitutions simply states "In the name of the Holy, Consubstantial, and Indivisible Trinity" and the Orthodox Church of Christ is established as the "prevailing" religion of Greece.

Mainstream Orthodox clergy salaries and pensions are paid by the State, at rates comparable to those of teachers.  The church had previously compensated the State by a tax of 35% on ordinary revenues of the church but, in 2004, this tax was abolished by Law 3220/2004.  By virtue of its status as the prevailing religion, the canon law of the Church is recognized by the Greek government in matters pertaining to church administration.  This is governed by the "Constitution of the Church of Greece", which was voted by Parliament into law.  Religious marriages and baptisms are legally equivalent to their civil counterparts and the relevant certificates are issued by officiating clergy.  All Greek Orthodox students in primary and secondary schools in Greece attend religious instruction.  Liaisons between church and state are handled by the Ministry of National Education and Religious Affairs.

Church hierarchy 

Supreme authority is vested in the synod of all the diocesan bishops who have metropolitan status (the Holy Synod of the Church of Greece, Greek:  Hierà Sýnodos tês Ekklēsías tês Helládos ) under the de jure presidency of the Archbishop of Athens and all Greece. This synod deals with general church issues. The Standing Synod is under the same presidency, and consists of the Primate and 12 bishops; each members serves for one term on a rotating basis and deals with administrative details.

The church is organized into 81 dioceses, of which 36, located in northern Greece and in the major islands in the north and northeast Aegean, are nominally and spiritually under the jurisdiction of the Ecumenical Patriarchate of Constantinople. The Patriarchate  retains certain privileges over and in them—for example, their bishops have to acknowledge the Patriarch as their own primate during prayers. They are called the "New Lands" (Νέαι Χώραι, or Néai Chōrai) as they became part of the modern Greek state only after the Balkan Wars, and are represented by 6 of the 12 bishops of the Standing Synod. A bishop elected to one of the Sees of the New Lands has to be confirmed by the Patriarch of Constantinople before assuming his duties.  These dioceses are administered by the Church of Greece "in stewardship" and their bishops retain their right of appeal (the "ékklēton") to the Patriarch.

The dioceses of Crete (Church of Crete), the Dodecanese, and the Monastic state of Holy Mount Athos remain under the direct jurisdiction of the Patriarchate of Constantinople; they are not part of the Church of Greece.  The Archdiocese of Crete enjoys semiautonomous status: new bishops are elected by the local Synod of incumbents, and the Archbishop is appointed by the Ecumenical Patriarchate from a three-person list (the triprósōpon) drawn by the Greek Ministry of National Education and Religious Affairs from among the incumbent Metropolitans of Crete.

Clergy and monastics
As in other Orthodox Christian churches, male graduates of seminaries run by the church (and financed by the Greek State), may be ordained as deacons and eventually priests. They are allowed to marry before their ordination as deacons, but not afterwards. The vast majority of parish clergy in Greece are married. Alternatively, they may enter monasteries and/or take monastic vows. Monastics who are ordained as priests, and possess a university degree in theology, are eligible as candidates for the episcopate (archimandrites). Women may also take monastic vows and become nuns, but they are not ordained.

Monasteries are either affiliated to their local diocese, or directly to one of the Orthodox Patriarchates; in the latter case they are called "Stauropegiac" monasteries (Stayropēgiaká, "springs of the Cross").

Old Calendarists

A split (schism) occurred within the church in 1924 when the Holy Synod decided to replace the Old Calendar (Julian) with a hybrid calendar—the so-called "Revised Julian Calendar"—which maintained a modified Julian dating method for Pascha while adopting the Gregorian Calendar date for fixed feasts. Those who refused to adopt this change are known as Old Calendarists (palaioimerologites in Greek) and still follow the old Julian Calendar. They themselves have suffered several schisms, and not all Old Calendarists comprise one church. They refer to themselves as "Genuine Orthodox Christians".  The largest group associating itself with Old Calendarists is the Synod of Archbishop Chrysostomos II Kioussis.  This Synod obtained government recognition as a valid Orthodox church, although it is not in communion with the Church of Greece nor with the other Eastern Orthodox churches.

History

Greece was an early center of Christianity. Upon formation of the Patriarchate, the Church was formerly a part of the Ecumenical Patriarchate of Constantinople.  Under Ottoman rule, the Muslims exercised no control over the church. With the establishment of the Greek kingdom, however, the government decided to take control of the church, breaking away from the patriarch in Constantinople.  The government declared the church to be autocephalous in 1833 in a political decision of the Bavarian Regents acting for King Otto, who was a minor. The decision roiled Greek politics for decades as royal authorities took increasing control.  The new status was finally recognized as such by the Patriarchate in 1850, under compromise conditions with the issue of a special "Tomos" decree which brought it back to a normal status. As a result, it retains certain special links with the "mother church". There were only four bishops, and they had political roles.

In 1833, Parliament dissolved 400 small monasteries having fewer than five monks or nuns. These monasteries played an important role in preserving the Greek language along with arts and tradition through generations of monks. Priests were not salaried; in rural areas they were peasant farmers themselves, dependent for their livelihood on their farm work and from fees and offerings by parishioners. Their ecclesiastical duties were limited to administering the sacraments, supervising funerals, the blessings of crops, and exorcism. Few attended seminaries. By the 1840s, there was a nationwide revival, run by traveling preachers. The government arrested several and tried to shut down the revival, but it proved too powerful when the revivalists denounced three bishops for purchasing their office. By the 1880s the "Anaplasis" ("Regeneration") Movement led to renewed spiritual energy and enlightenment. It fought against the rationalistic and materialistic ideas that had seeped in from secular Western Europe. It promoted catechism schools and Bible study circles.

Zoë movement
The 20th-century religious revival was led by the Zoë movement, which was founded in 1911. Based in Athens but operating in decentralized fashion, it reached a membership of laymen as well as some priests. The main activities include publications and the nationwide Sunday School movement in 7800 churches reaching 150,000 students. Zoë sponsored numerous auxiliaries and affiliated groups, including organizations for professional men, youth, parents, and young women nurses. A strong effort was made to circulate Bibles, illustrated novels, pamphlets, and other religious materials. A liturgical movement encouraged the laity to a greater awareness in the Eucharist, and more frequent Communion. Seminaries were built in the 20th century, but most of the graduates entered teaching rather than parish work. In 1920, only 800 of Greece's 4500 priests had any education beyond the elementary level. By 1959, out of 7000 priests no more than five percent had completed university and seminary training. Monastic life declined sharply, although it continued at remote Mount Athos.  Routine church life was highly disrupted by the Second World War and subsequent civil war, with many churches burned, and hundreds of priests and monks killed by the Germans on the one hand or the Communists on the other.

Administration and Hierarchy of the Throne 
Head of the Church of Greece and of the Holy Synod is Archbishop Ieronymos II (Ioannis Liapis), Archbishop of Athens and All Greece (2008–).

Metropolises and metropolitans of the Church of Greece

Metropolis of Aetolia and Acarnania : Damaskinos Kiametis(2022–)
Metropolis of Argolis : Nektarios Anttonopoulos (2013-)
Metropolis of Arta : Kallinikos Korombokis (2016-)
Metropolis of Cephalonia : Dimitrios Argiros (2015-)
Metropolis of Chalcis, Istiaia and Sporades Islands : Chrysostomos (Konstantinos) Triantafyllou (2001–)
Metropolis of Corfu, Paxoi and the Diapontian Islands : Nektarios (Dimitrios) Dovas (2002–)
Metropolis of Corinth : Dionysios Mantalos (2006–)
Metropolis of Demetrias and Almyros : Ignatios (Panagiotis) Georgakopoulos (1998–)
Metropolis of Elis and Olena : Athanasios Bachos (2022-)
Metropolis of Glyfada and Aexoni : Antonios Avramiotis(2019-)
Metropolis of Gortyna and Megalopolis : Nikiforos Eustathiou (2022–)
Metropolis of Gytheion and Oitylo (Metropolis of Mani from 2010) : Chrysostomos Papathanasiou(2018–)
Metropolis of Hydra, Spetses  and Aegina : Ephraem (Evangelos) Stenakis (2001–)
Metropolis of Kalavrita and Aigialeia : Ieronymos (Nikolaos) Karmas (2019-)
Metropolis of Karpenisi : Georgios Rempelos (2016-)
Metropolis of Karystos and Skyros : Seraphim (Sokrates) Roris (1968–)
Metropolis of Kessariani, Vyronas and Hymettus : Daniel (Dionysios) Pourtsouklis (2000–)
Metropolis of Kifissia, Amaroussion and Oropos : Kyrillos (Konstantinos) Misiakoulis 1 (2010–)
Metropolis of Kythira : Seraphim (lambros) Stergioulis (2005–)
Metropolis of Ilion, Acharnes and Petroupolis : Athenagoras (Georgios) Dikaiakos 1 (2010–)
Metropolis of Larissa and Tyrnavos : Hieronimos Nikolopoulos (2018-)
Metropolis of Leucada and Ithaca : Theofilos (Konstantinos) Manolatos (2008–)
Metropolis of Mantineia and Kynouria : Alexandros Papadopoulos (1995–)
Metropolis of Megara and Salamis : Konstantinos Giakoumakis (2014–)
Metropolis of Mesogeia and Lavreotiki : Nikolaos Hatzinikolaou (2004–)
Metropolis of Messinia : Chrysostomos (Georgios) Savvatos (2007–)
Metropolis of Monemvasia and Sparta : Eustathios (Konstantinos) Speliotis (1980–)
Metropolis of Nafpaktos and Agios Vlasios : Hierotheos Vlachos (1995–)
Metropolis of Nea Ionia and Philadelphia :  (2014-)
Metropolis of New Smyrna : Symeon (Periklis) Koutsas (2002–)
Metropolis of Nicaea : Alexios Vryonis (1995–)
Metropolis of Paronaxia (Paros, Naxos and Antiparos) : Kallinikos (Nikolaos) Demenopoulos (2008–)
Metropolis of Patras : Chrysostomos (Christos) Sklifas (2005–)
Metropolis of Peristeri :  Gregorios Papathomas (2021–)
Metropolis of Phocis : Theoktistos (Theodore) Kloukinas (2014-)
Metropolis of Phthiotis : Symeon Voliotis (2019-)
Metropolis of Piraeus : Seraphim Mentzenopoulos (2001–)
Metropolis of Stagi and Meteora : Theoklitos Lamprinakos(2017–)
Metropolis of Syros, Tinos, Andros, Kea and Milos : Dorotheos Polykandriotis (2001–)
Metropolis of Thessaliotida, Fanari and Pharsalos : Timotheos (Nikolaos) Anthis  (2014–)
Metropolis of Thebes and Livadeia : Georgios Matzouranis (2008–)
Metropolis of Thera, Amorgos and the Islands : Amfilochios Rousakis(2021–)
Metropolis of Trifyllia and Olympia : Chrysostomos (Alexandros) Stavropoulos (2007–)
Metropolis of Trikke and Stagi 2 :Chrysostomos Nasis(2015–),the metropolis at 2021 was renamed "Trikis,Gardikiou and Pylis"
Metropolis of Zakynthos and Strophades : Dionysios (Dimitrios) Sifnaios (2011–)

Notes
1 In 2010 the Metropolis of Attica was split into 2 new Metropolises, the Metropolis of Kifissia, Amaroussion and Oropos (temporary Vicar: the Metropolitan of Mesogeia) and the Metropolis of Ilion, Acharnes and Petroupolis (temporary Vicar: the Metropolitan of Megara)
2 The Metropolis of Trikke was separated from the Metropolis of Stagi (and Meteora) in 1981 but still bears the titular name "Trikke and Stagi"

Titular metropolises and metropolitans
Metropolis of Euripos : Vacant
Metropolis of Acheloos (Agrinio) : Vacant
Metropolis of Stavropigi : Vacant
Metropolis of Achaia : Athanasios Hatzopoulos (2007–)

Titular dioceses and bishops

Diocese of Christopolis : Vacant
Diocese of Velestino : Damaskinos (Ioannis) Kasanakis (2003–)
Diocese of Koronia : Panteleimon Kathreptidis (2003–)
Diocese of Neochori : Pavlos Athanatos (1995–)
Diocese of Marathon : Vacant
Diocese of Thermopylae : Ioannis Sakellariou (2000–)
Diocese of Fanari : Agathangelos (Vasileios) Haramantidis (2003–)
Diocese of Photice : Vacant
Diocese of Tanagra : Vacant
Diocese of Christianoupolis : Prokopios Petridis (2010–)
Diocese of Eleusis : Dorotheos Mourtsoukos (2009–)
Diocese of Rentina : Vacant
Diocese of Androusa : Constantios Panagiotakopoulos (2018-)
Diocese of Epidaurus : Vacant
Diocese of Oleni : Vacant

Metropolises and metropolitans of the New Lands
(under the jurisdiction of Constantinople until 1928, then under Athens; except the Dodecanese)

Metropolis of Alexandroupolis : Anthimos (Christos) Koukouridis (2004–)
Metropolis of Chios, Psara and Inousses and Exarchate of All Ionia : Markos Vasilakis (1965–)
Metropolis of Didymoteichon and Orestias and Exarchate of Haemimontos : Damaskinos (Minas) Karpathakis (2009–)
Metropolis of Drama : Dorotheos Paparis(2022–)
Metropolis of Dryinoupolis, Pogoniani and Konitsa and Exarchate of Northern Epirus : Andreas Trebelas (1995–)
Metropolis of Edessa, Pella and Almopia : Ioel (Panagiotis) Fragkakis (2002–)
Metropolis of Elassona and Exarchate of Mount Olympus : Hariton Toumpas (2014-)
Metropolis of Eleftheroupolis and Exarchate of Pangaeon : Chrysostomos (Ioannis) Avajianos (2004–)
Metropolis of Florina, Prespes and Eordaia : Theoklitos (Thomas) Pasalis (2000–)
Metropolis of Goumenissa, Axioupoli and Polykastro : Dimitrios Bekiaris-Mavrogonatos (1991–)
Metropolis of Grevena : David Tzioumakas(2014–)
Metropolis of Ierissos, Mount Athos and Ardameri : Theoklitos Athanasopoulos (2012–)
Metropolis of Ioannina and Exarchate of Epirus : Maximos Papagiannis (1975–)
Metropolis of Kassandria and Exarchate of All the Thermaic Gulf : Nikodemos (Konstantinos) Korakis (2001–)
Metropolis of Kastoria and Exarchate of Upper Macedonia : Kallinikos Georgatos (2021–)
Metropolis of Kitros, Katerini and Platamonas and Exarchate of Pieria : Georgios Chrysostomou(2014–)
Metropolis of Langadas : Platon Krikris(2021-)
Metropolis of Lemnos and Agios Efstratios and Exarchate of the North Aegean : Ierotheos Calogeropoulos(2019–)
Metropolis of Maronia and Komotini and Exarchate of Rhodope :Panteleimon Moutafis (2013-)
Metropolis of Mithymna : Chrysostomos (Kyriakos) Kalamatianos (1984–)
Metropolis of Mytilini, Eresos and Plomari : Iakovos Frantzis (1988–)
Metropolis of Neapolis and Stavroupolis : Varnavas (Markos) Tyris (2004–)
Metropolis of Nea Krini and Kalamaria : Ioustinos Bardakas (2015–)
Metropolis of Zichni and Nevrokopion : Ierotheos (Dimitrios) Tsoliakos (2003–)
Metropolis of Nicopolis and Preveza and Exarchate of Old Epirus : Chrysostomos Tsirigkas(2012-)
Metropolis of Paramythia, Filiates, Giromeri and Parga and Exarchate of Thesprotia : Titos (Sotirios) Papanakos (1974–)
Metropolis of Philippi, Neapolis and Thasos : Stefanos Tolios (2017–)
Metropolis of Polyani and Kilkision : Bartholomew Antoniou-Triantafyllides (2021–)
Metropolis of Samos and Ikaria : Eusebios (Evangelos) Pistolis (1995–)
Metropolis of Serres and Nigrita : Theologos (Ioannis) Apostolidis (2003–)
Metropolis of Servia and Kozani : Pavlos Papalexiou (2004–)
Metropolis of Siderokastron : Makarios (Sotirios) Philotheou (2001–)
Metropolis of Sisanion and Siatista :Athanasios Giannousas (2019-)
Metropolis of Thessaloniki : Anthimos (Dionysios) Roussas (2004–)
Metropolis of Veria and Naousa : Panteleimon (Ioannis) Kalpakidis (1994–)
Metropolis of Xanthi and Peritheorion and Exarchate of Western Thrace : Panteleimon (Michael) Kalaphatis (1995–)

See also

History of the Eastern Orthodox Church
List of Archbishops of Athens
National church
Religion in Greece

References

Bibliography
Tomkinson, John L., Between Heaven and Earth: The Greek Church, Anagnosis (Athens, 2004) 
Online Greek Orthodox Typikondeprecated as of Feb. 2019.

Further reading
 Aderny, Walter F. The Greek and Eastern Churches (1908) online
 Fortescue, Adrian. The Orthodox Eastern Church (1929)
 Kephala, Euphrosyne. The Church of the Greek People Past and Present (1930)
 Latourette, Kenneth Scott. ' Christianity in a Revolutionary Age, II: The Nineteenth Century in Europe: The Protestant and Eastern Churches. (1959) 2: 479-484; Christianity in a Revolutionary Age, IV: The Twentieth Century in Europe: The Roman Catholic, Protestant, and Eastern Churches'' (1958)

External links 

 
 Church of Greece at OrthodoxWiki
 Anagnosis Books Greek Church Pages
 Map of Old & New Lands 
 Article on the Church of Greece by Ronald Roberson on the CNEWA website

 
Apostolic sees
Religious organizations established in 1833
Greece
Greece
 
Greece
Christian denominations established in the 19th century
1833 establishments in Greece
Greek culture